Kanlıca is a neighbourhood on the Asian side of the Bosphorus strait, in the Beykoz district of Istanbul Province, Turkey. It is known for a yogurt  sprinkled with caster sugar, which is sold in local cafés, ibcluding the İsmailağa Kahvesi which has a small museum commemorating famous visitors of the past.

Location
The Bülbül Creek empties into the Bosphorus at Kanlıca Bay. The Mihrabat Nature Park is situated south of Kanlıca, north of Bülbül Creek.

The İskender Pasha Mosque, commissioned by (military judge) Kazasker Gazi İskender Pasha and originally built by Mimar Sinan in 1559–60, is located inland from Kanlıca Pier. The tomb of İskender Pasha is attached to the old timekeeper's lodge.The mosque has since been rebuilt so that no trace of the Sinan work survives. 

The Kanlıca Cemetery is on the hill east of the locality overlooking the Bosphorus. Notable burials of the cemetery include journalist Sedat Simavi, the musicians Barış Manço and Kayahan Açar.

Kanlıca Pier serves the City Ferry Lines connecting it with Arnavutköy, Bebek, Emirgan, and İstinye on the European shore and Anadoluhisarı, Kandilli and Çengelköy on the Asian shore. Kanlıca Pier is the starting point for the annual Bosphorus Intercontinental Swim, a -long open water swimming event across the Strait that finishes at Kuruçeşme on the European side of the city.

A road running inland from Kanlıca Pier leads to the hilltop Khedive's Palace (Hıdiv Kasrı).

History
During the Ottoman era, Kanlıca was an upscale neighbourhood, where wealthy people constructed elegant waterfront mansions. It is still home to many historic wooden waterfront mansions.

According to Ottoman estimations, in 1882 Kanlica had a population of 9,891, consisting of 6,095 Muslims, 3,043 Greeks, 708 Armenians, 41 Catholics and 4 Latins.

Gallery

References

Bosphorus
Neighbourhoods of Beykoz